Diana Jones is the name of:
Diana Wynne Jones (1934–2011), fantasy author
Diana Jones (singer-songwriter) (born circa 1965), American singer-songwriter
The Diana Jones Award, created in 2001 for excellence in gaming

See also:
Jones (surname)